Harshabardhan and Gobardhan ( are  humorous fictional characters in Bengali literature created by Shibram Chakraborty. Harshabardhan along with his younger brother Gobardhan, his wife, and the author Shibram are the subject of a number of satirical short stories. A characteristic of these stories is acerbic wit, play on words, and a characteristic goodnaturedness on the part of the characters. Harshabardhan is a successful black-marketeer dealing in timber who was born in Tezpur, Assam, migrates and lives in Ranaghat, West Bengal. Often to hide his ignorance on day-to-day matters, he comes up with outlandish explanations to impress his devoted younger brother and wife.

Character
"Harshabardhan" means whose wealth is joy and his brother's name, "Gobardhan"  whose wealth consists of cow-dung.

References

Male characters in literature
Fictional Bengali people
Fictional Indian people
Works about brothers
Fictional families